Arkhangelsk Oblast (Arkhangelskaya oblast) was an administrative division (an oblast) of Vologda Viceroyalty of the Russian Empire, which existed in 1780–1784. Its seat was located in the city of Arkhangelsk.

It was divided into six uezds,
 Kholmogorsky Uyezd with the center in Kholmogory;
 Kolsky Uyezd with the center in Kola;
 Mezensky Uyezd with the center in Mezen;
 Onezhsky Uyezd with the center in Onega;
 Pinezhsky Uyezd with the center in Pinega;
 Shenkursky Uyezd with the center in Shenkursk. 
Arkhangelsk was the center of the oblast but did not belong to any uezd.

In 1780, Arkhangelsk, Velsk, Kola, Krasnoborsk, Mezen, Onega, Pinega, Solvychegodsk, Shenkursk, and Yarensk were given the town status, and coat of arms were designed for these towns.

References

History of the administrative divisions of Russia
States and territories established in 1780
States and territories disestablished in 1784